Pagla Chandi railway station is a railway station under Sealdah railway division of Eastern Railway zone of India. It serves Gobindapur and nearby villages and situated besides the National Highway 34 at Gobindapur on the Lalgola to Krishnanagar line in Nadia in the Indian state of West Bengal. The station was named after Pagla Chandi, a flow less river of West Bengal. Few EMU and Lalgola passengers trains are passing through Pagla Chandi railway station.

References

Sealdah railway division
Railway stations in Nadia district
Kolkata Suburban Railway stations